NSU is a Tide Light Rail station in Norfolk, Virginia. It opened in August 2011 and is situated adjacent to Norfolk State University, just west of Brambleton Avenue. It is the only Tide station that is elevated, and is accessible by stairs and elevator.

References

External links 
NSU station

Tide Light Rail stations
Railway stations in the United States opened in 2011
2011 establishments in Virginia
Railway stations in Virginia at university and college campuses